Sìn Hồ is a township and capital of Sìn Hồ District, Lai Châu Province, Vietnam.

References

Populated places in Lai Châu province
District capitals in Vietnam
Townships in Vietnam